Rexford Falls is  located on Mad Brook east of Sherburne, New York. The historic Rexford Falls Bridge, built ca. 1870 is located directly over the falls. The bridge is a bowstring truss bridge and is used as a pedestrian bridge. In 2006, the bridge was rehabilitated at a cost of $40,000, with the Herbert H. & Mariea L. Brown Trust Foundation providing $30,000 of the total.

References

Waterfalls of New York (state)
Landforms of Chenango County, New York
Tourist attractions in Chenango County, New York